Transjordan, the East Bank, or the Transjordanian Highlands, is the part of the Southern Levant east of the Jordan River, mostly contained in present-day Jordan.

The region, known as Transjordan, was controlled by numerous powers throughout history. During the early modern period, the region of Transjordan was included under the jurisdiction of Ottoman Syrian provinces. After the Great Arab Revolt against Ottoman rule during the 1910s, the Emirate of Transjordan was established in 1921 by Hashemite Emir Abdullah, and the Emirate became a British protectorate. In 1946, the Emirate achieved independence from the British and in 1949 the country changed its name to the "Hashemite Kingdom of Jordan", after the Jordanian annexation of the West Bank following the 1948 Arab–Israeli War.

Name
The prefix trans- is Latin and means "across" or beyond, and so "Transjordan" refers to the land on the other side of the Jordan River. The equivalent term for the west side is the Cisjordan – literally, "on this side of the [River] Jordan".

History

Egyptian period

The Shasu were Semitic-speaking cattle nomads in the Levant from the late Bronze Age to the Early Iron Age. In a 15th-century BCE list of enemies inscribed on column bases at the temple of Soleb built by Amenhotep III, six groups of Shasu are noted; the Shasu of S'rr, the Shasu of Rbn, the Shasu of Sm't, the Shasu of Wrbr, the Shasu of Yhw, and the Shasu of Pysps. Some scholars link the Israelites and the worship of a deity named Yahweh with the Shasu.

The Egyptian geographical term "Retjenu", is traditionally identified as an area covering Sinai and Canaan south of Lebanon, with the regions of Amurru and Apu to the north. And as such, parts of Canaan and southwestern Syria became tributary to the Egyptian Pharaohs in the early Late Bronze Age. When Canaanite confederacies centered on Megiddo and Kadesh, came under the control of the Egyptian Empire. However, the empire's control was sporadic, and not strong enough to prevent frequent local rebellions and inter-city conflict.

Bronze Age collapse
During the Late Bronze Age collapse the Amorites of Syria disappeared after being displaced or absorbed by a new wave of semi-nomadic West Semitic-speaking peoples known collectively as the Ahlamu. Over time, the Arameans emerged as the dominant tribe amongst the Ahlamu; with the destruction of the Hittites and the decline of Assyria in the late 11th century BCE, they gained control over much of Syria and Transjordan. The regions they inhabited became known as Aram (Aramea) and Eber-Nari.

The Transjordanian Hebrew tribes

The Book of Numbers (chapter ) tells how the tribes of Reuben and Gad came to Moses to ask if they could settle in the Transjordan. Moses is dubious, but the two tribes promise to join in the conquest of the land, and so Moses grants them this region to live in. The half tribe of Manasseh are not mentioned until verse 33. David Jobling suggests that this is because Manasseh settled
in land which previously belonged to Og, north of the Jabbok, while Reuben and Gad settled Sihon's land, which lay south of the Jabbok. Since Og's territory was not on the route to Canaan, it was "more naturally part of the Promised Land", and so the Manassites' status is less problematic than that of the Reubenites or Gadites.

In the Book of Joshua, Joshua affirms Moses' decision, and urges the men of the two and a half tribes to help in the conquest, which they are willing to do. In Joshua 22, the Transjordanian tribes return, and build a massive altar by the Jordan. This causes the "whole congregation of the Israelites" to prepare for war, but they first send a delegation to the Transjordanian tribes, accusing them of making God angry and suggesting that their land may be unclean. In response to this, the Transjordanian tribes say that the altar is not for offerings, but is only a "witness". The western tribes are satisfied, and return home. Assis argues that the unusual dimensions of the altar suggest that it "was not meant for sacrificial use", but was, in fact, "meant to attract the attention of the other tribes" and provoke a reaction.

Per the settlement of the Israelite tribes east of the Jordan, Burton MacDonald notes;
There are various traditions behind the Books of Numbers, Deuteronomy, Joshua, Judges, and 1 Chronicles’ assignment of tribal territories and towns to Reuben, Gad, and the half-tribe of Manasseh. Some of these traditions provide only an idealized picture of Israelite possessions east of the Jordan; others are no more than vague generalizations. Num 21.21–35, for example, says only that the land the people occupied extended from Wadi Arnon to Wadi Jabbok, the boundary of the Amorites.

Status

There is some ambiguity about the status of the Transjordan in the mind of the biblical writers. Horst Seebass argues that in Numbers "one finds awareness of Transjordan as being holy to YHWH." He argues for this on the basis of the presence of the cities of refuge there, and because land taken in a holy war is always holy. Richard Hess, on the other hand, asserts that "the Transjordanian tribes were not in the land of promise."

Unlike the other tribal allotments, the Transjordanian territory was not divided by lot. Jacob Milgrom suggests that it is assigned by Moses rather than by God.

Lori Rowlett argues that in the Book of Joshua, the Transjordanian tribes function as the inverse of the Gibeonites (mentioned in ). Whereas the former have the right ethnicity, but wrong geographical location, the latter have the wrong ethnicity, but are "within the boundary of the 'pure' geographical location."

Other Transjordanian nations
According to Genesis,, Ammon and Moab were born to Lot and Lot's younger and elder daughters, respectively, in the aftermath of the destruction of Sodom and Gomorrah. The Bible refers to both the Ammonites and Moabites as the "children of Lot". Throughout the Bible, the Ammonites and Israelites are portrayed as mutual antagonists. During the Exodus, the Israelites were prohibited by the Ammonites from passing through their lands. In the Book of Judges, the Ammonites work with Eglon, king of the Moabites against Israel. Attacks by the Ammonites on Israelite communities east of the Jordan were the impetus behind the unification of the tribes under Saul.

According to both Books of Kings and Books of Chronicles, Naamah was an Ammonite. She was the only wife of King Solomon to be mentioned by name in the Tanakh as having borne a child. She was the mother of Solomon's successor, Rehoboam.

The Ammonites presented a serious problem to the Pharisees because many marriages with Ammonite (and Moabite) wives had taken place in the days of Nehemiah. The men had married women of the various nations without conversion, which made the children not Jewish. The legitimacy of David's claim to royalty was disputed on account of his descent from Ruth, the Moabite. King David spent time in the Transjordan after he had fled from the rebellion of his son Absalom.

Classical period

The Decapolis is named from its ten cities enumerated by Pliny the Elder (23–79). What Pliny calls Decapolis, Ptolemy (c. 100–c. 170) calls Cœle-Syria. Ptolemy does not use the term "Transjordan", but rather the periphrasis "across the Jordan". And he enumerates the cities; Cosmas, Libias, Callirhoe, Gazorus, Epicaeros—as being in this district—east of the Jordan, that Josephus et al. called Perea.

Jerash was a prominent central community for the surrounding region during the Neolithic period and was also inhabited during the Bronze Age. Ancient Greek inscriptions from the city, and the literary works of Iamblichus and the Etymologicum Magnum indicate that the city was founded as "Gerasa" by Alexander the Great or his general Perdiccas, for the purpose of settling retired Macedonian soldiers (γῆρας—gēras—means "old age" in Ancient Greek). It was a city of the Decapolis, and is one of the most important and best preserved Ancient Roman cities in the Near East.

The Nabataeans' trading network was centered on strings of oases that they controlled. The Nabataean kingdom reached its territorial zenith during the reign of Aretas III (87-62 BCE), when it encompassed parts of the territory of modern Jordan, Syria, Saudi Arabia, Egypt and Israel.

Bosra is located in a geographical area called the Hauran plateau. The soil of this volcanic plateau made it a fertile region for the cultivation of domesticated cereals during the Neolithic Agricultural Revolution. The city was noted in Egyptian documents of the 14th century BCE, and was situated on the trade routes where caravans brought spices from India and the Far East across the eastern desert while other caravans brought myrrh and frankincense from the south. The region of Hauran then called "Auranitis" came under the control of the Nabataean kingdom. And the city of Bosra then called "Bostra" became the northern capital of the kingdom while its southern capital was Petra. After Pompey's military conquest of Syria, Judaea, and Transjordan. Control of the city was later transferred to Herod the Great and his heirs until 106 CE, when Bosra was incorporated into the new Roman province of Arabia Petraea.

The Herodian kingdom of Judaea was a client state of the Roman Republic from 37 BCE, and included Samaria and Perea. And when Herod died in 4 BCE, the kingdom was divided among his sons into the Herodian Tetrarchy.

Provincia Arabia Petraea or simply Arabia, was a frontier province of the Roman Empire beginning in the 2nd century. It consisted of the former Nabataean kingdom in the southern Levant, Sinai Peninsula, and northwestern Arabian peninsula.

Crusader period: Oultrejordain
The Lordship of Oultrejordain (Old French for "beyond the Jordan"), also called the Lordship of Montreal, otherwise Transjordan, was part of the Crusader Kingdom of Jerusalem.

Trade routes
Roman roads
 Via Maris
 Via Traiana Nova
 Petra Roman Road

The King's Highway was a trade route of vital importance to the ancient Near East. It began in Egypt and stretched across the Sinai Peninsula to Aqaba. From there it turned northward across Transjordan, leading to Damascus and the Euphrates River. During the Roman period the road was called Via Regia (Orient). Emperor Trajan rebuilt and renamed it Via Traiana Nova (viz. Via Traiana Roma), under which name it served as a military and trade road along the fortified Limes Arabicus.

The Incense Route comprised a network of major ancient land and sea trading routes linking the Mediterranean world with Eastern and Southern sources of incense, spices and other luxury goods, stretching from Mediterranean ports across the Levant and Egypt through Northeastern Africa and Arabia to India and beyond. The incense land trade from South Arabia to the Mediterranean flourished between roughly the 7th century BCE to the 2nd century CE.

Maps 

 BCE

 CE

 Trade routes

 Egyptian Empire

Transjordan Kingdoms 830 BCE

Persian period and Diadochi period

Hellenistic period

Roman Orient

Roman Empire

See also
 The East Bank of the Jordan
 Emirate of Transjordan
 Geography of Jordan
 Gilead
 Oultrejordain
 Perea (region)
 Transjordan in the Bible, an area of land in the Southern Levant lying east of the Jordan River that is mentioned in the Hebrew Bible
 Transjordan memorandum

References

External links

 
Geography of the Middle East
Geography of Jordan
Regions of Jordan